The LFG Roland D.XVI, initially designated the LFG Roland E.I,  was a single-seat, single-engine, parasol wing German fighter aircraft flown close to the end of World War I. Only two were built.

Design and development

The D.XVI had a fully cantilevered fabric covered parasol wing mounted above the fuselage on a pair of N-form struts from the lower fuselage.  These struts were laterally stabilized with a near horizontal strut on each side, joining the upper fuselage and the upper end of the rear member of the N. In plan the wing was straight tapered with blunt tips and included a trailing edge cut-out to improve upward vision from the cockpit. The wing was quite thick and the ailerons short.

Its fuselage was flat-sided and rectangular in cross-section, with plywood covering. The prototypes differed in the way this covering was applied; on one the grain ran diagonally, on the other longitudinally.  They also differed in their vertical tails, one broader and lower than the other.  Both had deep horn balanced rudders which extended to the keel. The horizontal tail was mounted at mid-fuselage, with a straight-edged, unswept tailplane bearing overhung, balanced elevators with outward increasing chord. Both prototypes had conventional undercarriages with a rigid axle mounted to the lower fuselage by V-form struts.

The main difference between the two prototypes was in the engines, both fully cowled rotaries.  One had a 9-cylinder,  Goebel Goe.III, the other an 11-cylinder Siemens-Halske Sh.III of about the same power.  Both two and four blade propellers were used.

The Idflieg allowed the Sh.III engined version to take part in the third D-type competition for fighters even though that engine was not on its approved list. It was faster than either the Fokker D.VII or the Siemens-Schuckert D.IV below  but slower at higher altitude.

Specifications (Siemens-Halske engine)

Notes

References

Parasol-wing aircraft
1910s German fighter aircraft
LFG Roland D.XVI
Rotary-engined aircraft
Aircraft first flown in 1918